Arnulf of Carinthia ( 850 – 8 December 899) was the duke of Carinthia who overthrew his uncle Emperor Charles the Fat to become the Carolingian king of East Francia from 887, the disputed king of Italy from 894 and the disputed emperor from February 22, 896, until his death at Regensburg, Bavaria.

Early life

Illegitimacy and early life
Arnulf was the illegitimate son of Carloman of Bavaria, and Liutswind, who may have been the sister of Ernst, Count of the Bavarian Nordgau Margraviate, in the area of the Upper Palatinate, or perhaps the burgrave of Passau, according to other sources. After Arnulf's birth, Carloman married, before 861, a daughter of that same Count Ernst, who died after 8 August 879. As it is mainly West-Franconian historiography that speaks of Arnulf's illegitimacy, it is quite possible that the two females are actually the same person and that Carloman married Arnulf's mother, thus legitimizing his son.

Arnulf was granted the rule over the Duchy of Carinthia, a Frankish vassal state and successor of the ancient Principality of Carantania by his father, after Carloman reconciled with his own father, King Louis the German, and was made king in the Duchy of Bavaria.

Arnulf spent his childhood in Mosaburch or Mosapurc, which is widely believed to be Moosburg in Carinthia, a few miles away from one of the imperial residences, the Carolingian Kaiserpfalz at Karnburg, which had been the residence of the Carantanian princes. Arnulf kept his seat here, and from later events it may be inferred that the Carantanians, from an early time, treated him as their own duke. Later, after he had been crowned King of East Francia, Arnulf turned his old territory of Carinthia into the March of Carinthia, a part of the Duchy of Bavaria.

Regional ruler
After Carloman was incapacitated by a stroke in 879, Louis the Younger inherited Bavaria, Charles the Fat was given the Kingdom of Italy, and Arnulf was confirmed in Carinthia by an agreement with Carloman. However, Bavaria was more or less ruled by Arnulf  during the summer and autumn of 879 while his father arranged his succession. He was also granted "Pannonia," in the words of the Annales Fuldenses, or "Carantanum," in the words of Regino of Prüm. The division of the realm was confirmed in 880 after Carloman's death.

When Engelschalk II of Pannonia in 882 rebelled against Margrave Aribo and ignited the Wilhelminer War, Arnulf supported him and accepted his and his brother's homage. This ruined Arnulf's relationship with his uncle, Emperor Charles the Fat, and put him at war with Svatopluk of Moravia. Pannonia was invaded, but Arnulf refused to give up the young Wilhelminers. Arnulf did not make peace with Svatopluk until late 885, by which time the Moravian ruler was loyal to the emperor. Some scholars see this war as destroying Arnulf's hopes of succeeding Charles the Fat.

King of East Francia

Arnulf took the leading role in the deposition of Charles the Fat. With the support of the Frankish nobles, Arnulf called a Diet at Tribur and deposed Charles in November 887, under threat of military action. Charles peacefully agreed to this involuntary retirement, but not without first chastising his nephew for his treachery and asking for a few royal villas in Swabia on which to live out his final months, which Arnulf granted him. Arnulf, having distinguished himself in the war against the Slavs, was then elected king by the nobles of East Francia (only the eastern realm, though Charles had ruled the whole of the Frankish Empire). West Francia, the Kingdom of Burgundy, and the Kingdom of Italy elected their own kings from the Carolingian family.

Like all early Germanic rulers, he was heavily involved in ecclesiastical disputes. In 895, at the Diet of Tribur, he presided over a dispute between the Episcopal sees of Bremen, Hamburg and Cologne over jurisdictional authority, which saw Bremen and Hamburg remain a combined see, independent of the see of Cologne.

Arnulf was a fighter, not a negotiator. In 890 he was successfully battling Slavs in Pannonia. In early/mid-891, Vikings invaded Lotharingia and crushed an East Frankish army at Maastricht. Terms such as "Vikings", "Danes", "Northmen" and "Norwegians" have been used loosely and interchangeably to describe these invaders. In September 891, Arnulf repelled the Vikings and essentially ended their attacks on that front. The Annales Fuldenses report that there were so many dead Northmen that their bodies blocked the run of the river. After this victory Arnulf built a castle on an island in the Dijle river.

Intervention in West Francia
Arnulf took advantage of the problems in West Francia after the death of Charles the Fat to secure the territory of Lotharingia, which he converted into a kingdom for his son Zwentibold. In 889 Arnulf supported the claim of Louis the Blind to the kingdom of Provence, after receiving a personal appeal from Louis' mother, Ermengard, who came to see Arnulf at Forchheim in May 889.

Recognising the superiority of Arnulf's position, in 888 king Odo of France formally accepted the suzerainty of Arnulf. In 893 Arnulf switched his support from Odo to Charles the Simple after being persuaded by Fulk, Archbishop of Reims, that it was in his best interests. Arnulf then took advantage of the following fighting between Odo and Charles in 894, harrying some territories of West Francia. At one point, Charles the Simple was forced to flee to Arnulf and ask for his protection. His intervention soon forced Pope Formosus to get involved, as he was worried that a divided and war weary West Francia would be easy prey for the Vikings.

In 895 Arnulf summoned both Charles and Odo to his residence at Worms. Charles's advisers convinced him not to go, and he sent a representative in his place. Odo, on the other hand, personally attended, together with a large retinue, bearing many gifts for Arnulf. Angered by the non-appearance of Charles, he welcomed Odo at the Diet of Worms in May 895 and again supported Odo's claim to the throne of West Francia. In the same assembly he crowned his illegitimate son Zwentibold as the king of Lotharingia.

Wars with Moravia
As early as 880 Arnulf had designs on Great Moravia and had the Frankish bishop Wiching of Nitra interfere with the missionary activities of the Eastern Orthodox priest Methodius, with the aim of preventing any potential for creating a unified Moravian state. Arnulf had formal relations with the ruler of the Moravian Kingdom, Svatopluk, using them to learn the latter's military and political secrets. Later, these tactics were used to occupy the territory of the Greater Moravian state.

Arnulf failed to conquer the whole of Great Moravia in wars of 892, 893, and 899. Yet Arnulf did achieve some successes, in particular in 895, when the Duchy of Bohemia broke away from Great Moravia and became his vassal state. An accord was reached between him and Duke of Bohemia Borivoj I. Bohemia was thus freed from the dangers of Frankish invasion. In 893 or 894 Great Moravia probably lost a part of its territory — present-day western Hungary — to him. As a reward, Wiching became Arnulf's chancellor in 892. In his attempts to conquer Moravia, in 899 Arnulf reached out to Magyars who had settled in the Carpathian Basin, and with their help he imposed a measure of control over Moravia.

King of Italy and Holy Roman Emperor

In Italy Guy III of Spoleto and Berengar of Friuli fought over the Iron Crown of Lombardy. Berengar had been crowned king in 887, but Guy was then crowned in 889. While Pope Stephen V supported Guy, even crowning him Roman Emperor in 891, Arnulf threw his support behind Berengar.

In 893 the new Pope Formosus, not trusting the newly crowned co-emperors Guy and his son Lambert, sent an embassy to Omuntesberch, where Arnulf was meeting with Svatopluk, to request that Arnulf come and liberate Italy, where he would be crowned emperor in Rome. Arnulf met the Primores of the Kingdom of Italy, dismissed them with gifts and promised to assist the pope. Arnulf then sent Zwentibold with a Bavarian army to join Berengar. They defeated Guy but were bought off and left in autumn.

When Pope Formosus again asked Arnulf to invade, the duke personally led an army across the Alps early in 894. In January 894 Bergamo fell, and Count Ambrose, Guy's representative in the city, was hung from a tree by the city's gates. Conquering all of the territory north of the Po River, Arnulf forced the surrender of Milan and then drove Guy out of Pavia, where he was crowned King of Italy. Arnulf went no further before Guy died suddenly in late autumn, and a fever incapacitated his troops. His march northward through the Alps was interrupted by Rudolph I of Burgundy, and it was only with great difficulty that Arnulf crossed the mountain range. In retaliation, Arnulf ordered Zwentibold to ravage Rudolph's kingdom. In the meantime, Lambert and his mother Ageltrude travelled to Rome to receive papal confirmation of his imperial succession, but when Pope Formosus, still desiring to crown Arnulf, refused, he was imprisoned in Castel Sant'Angelo.

In September 895 a new papal embassy arrived in Regensburg beseeching Arnulf's aid. In October Arnulf undertook his second campaign into Italy. He crossed the Alps quickly and again took Pavia, but then he continued slowly, garnering support among the nobility of Tuscany. Maginulf, Count of Milan, and Walfred of Friuli joined him. Eventually even Adalbert II of Tuscany abandoned Lambert. Finding Rome locked against him and held by Ageltrude, Arnulf had to take the city by force on 21 February, 896, freeing the pope. Arnulf was then greeted at the Ponte Milvio by the Roman Senate who escorted him into the Leonine City, where he was received by Pope Formosus on the steps of the Santi Apostoli.

On 22 February 896 Formosus led the king into the church of St. Peter, anointed and crowned him as emperor, and saluted him as Augustus. Arnulf then proceeded to the Basilica of Saint Paul Outside the Walls, where he received the homage of the Roman people, who swore "never to hand over the city to Lambert or his mother Ageltrude". Arnulf then proceeded to exile to Bavaria two leading senators, Constantine and Stephen, who had helped Ageltrude to seize Rome.

Leaving one of his vassals, Farold, to hold Rome, two weeks later Arnulf marched on Spoleto, where Ageltrude had fled to join Lambert.However at this point, Arnulf had a stroke, forcing him to call off the campaign and return to Bavaria. Rumours of the time made Arnulf's condition to be a result of poisoning at the hand of Ageltrude.

Arnulf retained power in Italy only as long as he was personally there. On his way north, he stopped at Pavia where he crowned his illegitimate son Ratold as sub-king of Italy, after which he left Ratold in Milan in an attempt to preserve his hold on Italy. That same year Pope Formosus died, leaving Lambert once again in power, and both he and Berengar proceeded to kill any officials who had been appointed by Arnulf, forcing Ratold to flee from Milan to Bavaria. For the rest of his life Arnulf exercised very little control in Italy, and his agents in Rome did not prevent the accession of Pope Stephen VI in 896. The pope initially gave his support to Arnulf but eventually became a supporter of Lambert.

Final years
In addition to aftereffects from the stroke, Arnulf's contracted morbus pediculosis (infestation of pubic lice on his eyelid), which prevented him from effectively dealing with the problems besetting his reign. Italy was lost, raiders from Moravia and Magyars were continually harassing his lands, and Lotharingia was in revolt against Zwentibold. He was also plagued by escalating violence and power struggles among the lower Frankish nobility.

On December 8, 899, Arnulf died at Ratisbon in present-day Bavaria. He is entombed in St. Emmeram's Basilica at Regensburg, which is now known as Schloss Thurn und Taxis, the palace of the Princes of Thurn und Taxis. He was succeeded as the king of East Francia by his only legitimate son from Ota, Louis the Child. After Louis' death in 911 at age 17 or 18, the East Frankish branch of the Carolingian dynasty ceased to exist. Arnulf had had the nobility recognize the rights of his illegitimate sons, Zwentibold and Ratold, as his successors. Zwentibold continued to rule Lotharingia until his murder in 900.

See also 

Family tree of German monarchs
List of Frankish kings

Notes

References 
 Duckett, Eleanor (1968). Death and Life in the Tenth Century. Ann Arbor: University of Michigan Press.
 Comyn, Robert. History of the Western Empire, from its Restoration by Charlemagne to the Accession of Charles V, Vol. I. 1851
 Bryce, James, The Holy Roman Empire, MacMillan. 1913
 Mann, Horace, K. The Lives of the Popes in the Early Middle Ages, Vol III: The Popes During the Carolingian Empire, 858–891. 1925
 Mann, Horace, K. The Lives of the Popes in the Early Middle Ages, Vol IV: The Popes in the Days of Feudal Anarchy, 891–999. 1925

850s births
899 deaths
Year of birth uncertain
9th-century Holy Roman Emperors
9th-century kings of Italy
9th-century kings of East Francia
9th-century dukes of Bavaria
Frankish warriors
Kings of Bavaria
Kings of Saxony
Kings of Lotharingia
People from Carinthia (state)
Burials at St. Emmeram's Abbey